Henry McKay (1 January 1883 – 12 February 1926) was an Australian cricketer. He played in three first-class matches for South Australia in 1912/13.

See also
 List of South Australian representative cricketers

References

External links
 

1883 births
1926 deaths
Australian cricketers
South Australia cricketers
Cricketers from Adelaide